Melville House Publishing is an American independent publisher of literary fiction, non-fiction, and poetry. The company was founded in 2001 and is run by the husband-and-wife team of Dennis Loy Johnson and Valerie Merians in Hoboken, New Jersey. The company is named after the author Herman Melville. It has a reputation as an "activist press" and publisher of left-leaning books.

History

The company was founded by husband-and-wife team of Dennis Johnson and Valerie Merians. Johnson wrote a blog called "MobyLives" and after the 9/11 attacks collected poetry related to the event and published it as a book to great success, which launched the company. They intended Melville to be a low volume boutique that specializes in poetry and "highly literary" novels issuing less than six a year. The company has a reputation as a "activist press" and became known for works of "political reportage with a leftist streak". Johnson once said they formed the company with the notion of "getting Bush out of office" in the immediate aftermath of 9/11.

In 2007, they were named by the Association of American Publishers as the winner of the 2007 Miriam Bass Award for Creativity in Independent Publishing. The Little Girl and The Cigarette published by Melville was part of the AIGA (American Institute of Graphic Arts) "50 books/50 Covers" cover design award for 2007. 

In 2008 Melville House moved to Dumbo, Brooklyn, to a location that includes a bookstore with their offices. The opening was on January 19, 2008. In 2013, Melville House started a sister company in the United Kingdom, Melville House UK.

Melville House publishes books in several series. These include the Art of the Novella Series, which The Atlantic called an "ongoing celebration of the form", and which includes classics by Miguel de Cervantes, Anton Chekhov, Virginia Woolf. The Neversink Library, "a collection of lost, forgotten, and 'foolishly ignored' books from around the world". The Last Interview series, which collects interviews with prominent writers, including the last interviews given before their deaths, has included Ernest Hemingway, Philip K. Dick and Nora Ephron.

In 2014, it published the Senate Intelligence Committee report on CIA torture in just 19 days; and later that year, an edition of the Pope Francis' Laudato si', an encyclical on climate change, soon after the Pope released it. The speed of publications has been called "extraordinary" for the industry. In 2016, Melville House published The Making of Donald Trump by David Cay Johnston. Melville used a process they call "crashing the book" to work around the clock and bring the book out in 27 days.

References

External links

Publishing companies established in 2001
Book publishing companies based in New York City
Companies based in Brooklyn